Nazareth is a town in western Lesotho. It is located to the east of the capital, Maseru, and west of the God Help Me Pass. Ha Baroana, an important archaeological site, is located just to the north of Nazareth.

References
Fitzpatrick, M., Blond, B., Pitcher, G., Richmond, S., and Warren, M. (2004)  South Africa, Lesotho and Swaziland. Footscray, VIC: Lonely Planet.

Populated places in Lesotho